Maria Jessica Aspiras Soho (born March 27, 1964) is a Filipino broadcast journalist known as the host of the news magazine program Kapuso Mo, Jessica Soho (2004present) on GMA Network GTV & Pinoy Hits. She formerly anchored the newscast State of the Nation with Jessica Soho on GMA News TV from 2011 to 2021.

Soho is a multi-awarded journalist. In 1998, Soho became the first Filipino to win the British Fleet Street Award for Journalism. In 1999, Soho and the I-Witness team received the Philippines' first Peabody Award for producing the "Kidneys for Sale" and "Kamao" documentaries. Soho's story of a hostage crisis in Cagayan Valley made her the first Filipino to win in the New York Film Festival.

Early life 
Maria Jessica Aspiras Soho was born in San Fernando, La Union, Philippines, on March 27, 1964. Her parents are Abelardo Soho, a government employee, and Maura Aspiras, an agriculturist. Soho's grandmothers, Sixta "Apo Ittang" Aspiras and Concepción "Cion" Soho, influenced her in telling stories.

Soho attended the University of the Philippines Diliman to study mass communication. One of her professors was Luis Beltran, who inspired Soho to finish her studies and practice journalism in Manila.

Career

Soho joined GMA News and Public Affairs in January 1985. Soho's first voice-over report was a feature story on the inauguration of the Manila Line 1 from Baclaran to Monumento. Soho was later assigned to the defense and military beats.

In 1991, Soho earned a Bronze Award at the New York Film Festival for her coverage of a hostage crisis in Cagayan Valley, the first for a Filipino. She also received the Ka Doroy Valencia Award given by the Kapisanan ng mga Brodkaster ng Pilipinas. In 1994, she received the Grand Prize from the Asia-Pacific Broadcasting Union for her coverage of a breaking news story. Soho is included in the list of 100 Filipino Women of Distinction chosen during the Philippine Centennial celebrations.

Soho helped conceptualize the one-hour documentary television program I-Witness, which she co-presented from its premiere in 1999 to 2004. The I-Witness documentaries "Kidneys for Sale" and "Kamao" made her the first Filipino reporter, with GMA Network as the first Filipino network, to win a Peabody Award in 1999. She won the Asian Television Award for Best News and Current Affairs Special for the 2001 "Saksi Sa Kasaysayan" documentary.

In 2014, Soho's GMA news programs Kapuso Mo, Jessica Soho and State of the Nation with Jessica Soho were recognized by the Peabody Awards for their coverage on Super Typhoon Yolanda. State of the Nation also earned Soho consecutive wins for Most Trusted News Presenter by Reader's Digest Asia.

In 2015, Soho was given an honorary doctorate in humanities by the University of Northeastern Philippines during its 67th commencement exercises on April.

Controversies
In May 2013, a controversy sparked involving Soho and comedian Vice Ganda, involving a joke directed at the anchor during the latter's concert held that May. Vice mentioned Soho, among several other personalities, in a stand-up skit involving celebrities starring in a pornographic film, adding that Soho would be gang raped if she were cast, as well as making several jokes ridiculing her weight. Vice Ganda later issued a public apology during his regular appearances in It's Showtime, admitting to his wrongdoing and that he offended Soho and several others with his jokes. Soho later acknowledged Vice's apology but she denied any intent to close any further discussion with the comedian.

In June 2021, Nas Daily announced that Soho, among other known Filipino personalities, which include Miss Universe 2018 Catriona Gray, fashion designer Michael Cinco, and food vlogger Erwan Heussaff would teach courses through his Nas Academy. However, following the Whang-od controversy, Jessica Soho has made a statement that she would no longer pursue the Jessica Soho course in Nas Academy.

In January 2022, Soho was accused of being "biased" against Bongbong Marcos, a presidential candidate in the 2022 Philippine presidential election, by his spokesman Victor Rodriguez after declining to participate in The Jessica Soho Presidential Interviews on GMA Network. GMA responded to Rodriguez's claim on Marcos' absence, saying "Throughout her career, Ms. Soho has consistently been named the most trusted media personality in the Philippines by both local and foreign organizations, a testament to her embodiment of the GMA News and Public Affairs ethos: 'Walang Kinikilingan, Walang Pinoprotektahan, Serbisyong Totoo Lamang'".

Accolades

International recognitions
Asian TV Festival

British Embassy in Manila

Reader's Digest Trusted Brands Asia

Local recognitions
Adamson University

ALTA Media Icon Awards

Anak TV Seal Award

Catholic Mass Media Awards

CCP Gawad Natatanging Parangal

CLASS Awards (City of Malabon University)

COMGUILD Center for Journalism

EdukCircle Awards

Federation of Philippine Industries, Inc.

FemaleNetwork.com

Gawad Duyan Awards

Gawad Pasado Awards

Golden Dove Awards

International Association of Business Communicators (IABC) Philippines

International Business and Academe Conference's Service Excellence and Partners Awards

International Center for Communication Studies (ICCS)

Kapisanan ng mga Brodkaster ng Pilipinas

Mary Kay Philippines

Metro Pacific Corporation Journalism Awards

Metrobank Foundation

MTRCB TV Awards

Paragala Awards

Platinum Stallion Media Awards

PMAP Makatao Awards for Media Excellence

PMPC Star Awards for Television

School Press Advisers Movement (SPAM)

PUP Mabini Media Awards

The Outstanding Women in the Nation’s Service (TOWNS)

Ten Outstanding Young Men (TOYM) Award

Rotary Club of Manila

UmalohokJUAN Awards

UPLB Gandingan Awards

USTv Students' Choice Awards

Honors
 Doctor of Humanities, Honoris Causa – University of Northeastern Philippines (2015)

References 

1964 births
Living people
Ilocano people
Filipino people of Chinese descent
Filipino reporters and correspondents
Filipino television news anchors
Filipino television presenters
Filipino women journalists
Filipino women television presenters
GMA Network personalities
GMA Integrated News and Public Affairs people
Peabody Award winners
People from San Fernando, La Union
University of the Philippines Diliman alumni
Women television journalists